The Chery QQ is a city car produced by the Chinese manufacturer Chery after May 2003. In 2006, Chery created a QQ-branded product line that included the original QQ (rebadged as a QQ3), a sedan version called Chery QQ6 released in September 2006 and a three-door hatchback called Chery QQme released in June 2009.
A slightly redesigned model of the original QQ was revealed at the 2011 Guangzhou Auto Show, and was renamed Chery QQ3 Sport and a new generation was introduced at the 2013 Shanghai Auto Show. The second generation was sold by the DR Automobiles as the DR Zero in Italy.

First generation (2003–2015) 

Its cheap price (in 2008 it may have been the cheapest production car in the world) made the car popular in China. In the 2000s, the QQ was often Chery's most sold model, and the company itself calls the car "a legend in the Chinese history of the automobile... a mini model with the highest cumulative sales in China". It may no longer be popular; the QQ was dropped from a list of top ten bestsellers compiled by the China Association of Automobile Manufacturers  2010. Even if its popularity is flagging, it remains cheap. The lowest cost QQ is about US$4,000 as of 2012.

It was at the center of an intellectual property dispute between Chery and GM in the late 2000s.

Copying controversy 

General Motors claimed the car was a copy of the Daewoo Matiz (which is marketed in some countries as the Chevrolet Spark) and sued Chery in a Chinese court. The Detroit News reported that "the dispute reflects the confusion, risks and ambitions in China's new auto industry, where global carmakers are battling pugnacious upstarts for a piece of what may become the world's largest auto market."

GM China Group indicated the two vehicles "shared remarkably identical body structure, exterior design, interior design and key components" MotorAuthority.com and GM executives demonstrated the extent of the design duplication, noting for example that the doors of the QQ and those of the Spark are interchangeable.

Safety 
Though the Chery QQ and the Daewoo Matiz are superficially similar cars, their safety ratings differ dramatically. A Euro NCAP front offset crash test showed that the driver's injuries in the QQ are worse than those sustained in the Matiz. Upon impact, the QQ driver will most likely suffer severe (possibly fatal) head trauma, and trauma to the neck and chest areas. The first generation Daewoo Matiz achieved a three/two star driver/passenger Euro NCAP rating.

The African version of the QQ3 with no airbags and no ABS received 0 stars for adult occupants and 0 stars for infants from Global NCAP in 2017 (similar to Latin NCAP 2013).

Engine 
The QQ is available with three gasoline-powered engines (both EURO III compliant):

 0.8 L SQR372 DOHC 12V I3 —  at 6,000 rpm,  at 3,500 rpm
 1.1 L DA465Q-1A2/D SOHC 16V I4 —  at 5,300 rpm,  at 3,000 rpm
 1.1 L SQR472F DOHC 16V I4 —  at 6,000 rpm,  at 3,500 rpm

QQ3 EV (electric version) 
An all-electric version, the Chery QQ3 EV, began deliveries to retail customers in Wuhu, Anhui province in March 2010.

The QQ3 EV was the top selling new energy car in China between 2011 and 2013, with 2,167 units sold in 2011, 3,129 in 2012, and 5,727 in 2013. The QQ3 EV was surpassed in 2014 by the BYD Qin plug-in hybrid as the top selling new energy car in the country. Cumulative sales between January 2011 and June 2015 reached 22,097 units.

A new model based on the Chery QQ3 Sport with a  electric motor was expected to be launched by the end of 2012. In the United States, Miles Electric Vehicles was planning to release the rebadged version of the QQ3 EV called the Miles ZX50S AD in 2012.

Global markets
The QQ is available in a number of export markets including Pakistan, Philippines (called QQ3), Singapore, Sri Lanka, South Africa (QQ3), Thailand and Vietnam.

In Iran Kerman Khodro reached an agreement to produce the Chery QQ domestically in 2006, and it is marketed there as the MVM 110. It is offered with two engine options, a 3-cylinder 0.8 liter and a 4-cylinder 1.1 liter.

In Iran, production of the QQ followed a 2002 decision from GM to stop supplying Kerman Khodro with Daewoo Matiz knock-down kits. Daewoo cars had been assembled by the company since 1997, but this Korean automaker stopped exporting to Iran after being acquired by GM in 2002.It is offered with two engine options, a 3-cylinder 0.8 liter and a 4-cylinder 1.1 liter. Quest Motor Corporation is also assembling the Chery QQ since some time in the year 2011.

As of 2006, the QQ is being sold in Malaysia, with the 0.8 L (812 cc) engine producing 52 hp at 6,000 rpm and a max torque of 75.5 Nm between 3,500 and 4,000rpm.

In 2012, the model received a facelift and was sold in its home market as the QQ3 Sport. With some inspiration from the 2008 Kia Morning/Picanto, the front and rear ends were completely redesigned. It mounted a new, more efficient 1.0L engine (SQR371F), a black interior with silver-painted inserts and a darker bi-color upholstery.

United Alpha 
In Pakistan a local company, United Cars builds under license the Facelift of the first generation of the QQ.

Second generation (2013–present) 

The second generation was launched at the Shanghai auto show in 2013 and was based on a modified platform of the previous generation. The engine is a 1.0L I3 petrol derived from the 0.8L of the first QQ, for the export market (like South America) the QQ used a 1.0L flex fuel version. From 2015 the Chery QQ was imported in Italy by DR Automobiles and rebadged as a DR Zero.

Codenamed "S15", this long-awaited redesign hit its home market in March 2013. It is based in a slightly larger QQ3-based platform, with bigger 14' inch wheels as standard and several mechanical improvements, sharing many of its components with previous models of the brand, like the A1 and the Riich M1, as a way to reduce development costs and simplify its assembly process, following a similar strategy to what was done in the Toyota Aygo/Citroën C1/Peugeot 107 line-up (which the new QQ looks similar to by the way). A good example of this can be seen on the back of the car, where an enlarged glass replaces the rear door seen on the previous model. 
The interior habitability, design and materials were also improved, introducing 
for the very first time customisable upholstery and dashboard accents.

The 1,000,000th Chery QQ was built on 1 September 2013, cumulative production include first and second generation, sedan QQ6 and the QQme.

Safety
The Chinese—made iQ in its most basic Latin American configuration with no airbags and no ABS received 0 stars for adult occupants and 0 stars for toddlers from Latin NCAP in 2015.

Chery eQ (electric version) 

The Chery eQ, a full-electric minicar based on the new generation QQ, was launched in the Chinese car market in November 2014. The electric motor delivers 57 hp and 150 nm powered by a lithium-ion battery.

References

External links 

  
Chery QQ Global site
Chery QQ Auto Parts Catalog
Chery QQ in iran

QQ3
City cars
Global NCAP superminis
Latin NCAP superminis
2000s cars
2010s cars
Works involved in plagiarism controversies